Brantano (UK) Ltd was a British shoe retailer, owned by Alteri Investors. The company was started in 1998 by the purchase of 47 Shoe City stores from the British Shoe Corporation by the Belgian retailer Brantano Footwear. It was owned by Macintosh Retail Group until it was bought by Alteri in October 2015. The company entered administration in March 2017 and closed its last store in June 2017.

History
The company originated from a small factory in Lede, East Flanders operated by Andre Brantegem and his brother. Following the fall of the "Shoe City" in mid-1990s, Brantano took over it.

Between 2008 and 2010, Brantano refurbished their stores to bring a new modern style to coincide with the television advertisement airing. In 2009, Brantano introduced a new concept of layout, by laying out merchandise in styles rather than sizes.

In November 2011, Brantano opened their new website including many new features and a new streamlined design.

In 2015, Brantano opened 36 new stores in the UK, and planned to expand into 2015-2016 to open many more stores.

The company was purchased along with its sister company Jones Bootmaker by restructuring specialist Alteri Investors in October 2015 for £12 million. In January 2016, Brantano UK filed for administration and was bought back by Alteri.

Alteri filed an intention to appoint administrators for Jones on 15 March 2017, and entered Brantano into administration for a second time on 22 March 2017. All stores have since closed.

Brands

Clarks
Hush Puppies
US Brass
CAT
Wrangler
Nike
Reebok
Rocket Dog
Skechers
Lotus
Lambretta
Puma
Gola
Adidas
Rider
Pikolinos
Ravel
Pineapple
KangaRoos
Kickers
Bootleg
Osh Koosh
Front
Frank Wright
Characters (e.g., Peppa Pig, Toy Story)

Brantano has their own brands manufactured by external companies:

Red Level - Men's and Ladies (Discontinuing 2013/14)
Orchard - Men's and Ladies
Osaga, Mecury or MX2 - Men's, Ladies and Kids
Emilo Luca X - Men's and Ladies
Emilo Luca X Red - Men's and Ladies
Zinc - Men's
Stone Creek - Men's
Feet Street - Kids
B-Club - Kids
Skittles - Kids

Advertising
Brantano UK Ltd launched a television advert, which features a fictional psychologist called Anne-Marie Brantano, portrayed as one of the giants of twentieth century psychology along with Sigmund Freud and Carl Jung. She is supposed to have discovered the 'sling-back synapse'; an imaginary part of the female brain in the shape of a shoe, which reveals what women want from their shoe shopping experience. It also describes the condition "shoe rage".  The concept of the campaign was to change the public's perception of Brantano from a discount warehouse, to a high fashion, affordable shoe megastore.

Charity
Brantano UK has been helping to raise money for the baby charity Tommy's since 2008 and have raised £104,751.48 so far through its in-store fundraising events.

References

British companies established in 1998
Clothing companies established in 1998
Retail companies established in 1998
Retail companies disestablished in 2017
British companies established in 2018
Clothing companies established in 2018
Retail companies established in 2018
Retail companies of the United Kingdom
Companies that have entered administration in the United Kingdom
Footwear retailers